Bina Paul (born January 28, 1961), also known by her married name Bina Paul Venugopal, is an Indian film editor who works mainly in Malayalam-language films. A graduate of the University of Delhi, she completed a course on film editing from the Film and Television Institute of India (FTII), Pune, in 1983.

She is the recipient of two National Film Awards and three Kerala State Film Awards. She has held several positions including the artistic director of International Film Festival of Kerala (IFFK) and the vice chairperson of Kerala State Chalachitra Academy.

Personal life

She is married to cinematographer Venu since 26 August 1983. The couple has a daughter, Malavika, who is married to an Englishman and is the Manager of the Great North Museum: Hancock.

Biography

Early life 
Born to a Malayali father and a Kannadiga mother, Bina Paul was brought up in Delhi. After graduating from the University of Delhi in 1979 with a bachelor's degree in psychology, she went on to pursue a diploma in film editing from the Film and Television Institute of India (FTII), Pune, in 1983.

Career 

Paul got a break as an editor with G. Aravindan's The Seer Who Walks Alone (1985), a documentary on Jiddu Krishnamurti. She went on to work in a few documentaries including Rajiv Vijay Raghavan's Sister Alphonsa of Bharananganam (1986), which won the Best Biographical Film at the 34th National Film Awards. She made her feature film debut with John Abraham's Amma Ariyan (1986). Her other films include Padippura (1989), Janmadinam (1997), Agnisakshi (1999). Her work in Revathi's Mitr, My Friend (2002), which had an all-woman crew, won her her first National Film Award. The following year, she was awarded another National Film Award for the non-feature film Unni. She has also worked in television and has been the recipient of three Kerala State Television Award for Best Editor.

Apart from editing over 50 documentaries and feature films, Paul has directed four documentaries. She has collaborated with women filmmakers like Revathi, Suma Josson, Pamela Rooks and Shabnam Virmani.

Paul played a prominent role in shaping up the International Film Festival of Kerala (IFFK) right from its inception and also served as its artistic director. She also served as the deputy director (festival) of Kerala State Chalachitra Academy and worked as a senior editor at the Centre for Development of Imaging Technology. She served as the principal of the L. V. Prasad Film Academy (Thiruvananthapuram campus). In February 2017, she co-founded the Women in Cinema Collective, India's first association that aims to work towards equal opportunity and dignity of women employees in film industry.

Personal life 
Paul married director - cinematographer Venu, a fellow student at the FTII, in 1983; the couple has a daughter. The two have worked together in several films including Daya (1998), Munnariyippu (2014) and Carbon(2018), all directed by Venu.

Selected filmography 

 The Seer Who Walks Alone (1985)
 Sister Alphonsa of Bharananganam (1986)
 Amma Ariyan (1986)
 Padippura (1989)
 When Women Unite (1996)
 Daya (1998)
 Janmadinam (1998)
 Agnisakshi (1999)
 Angene Oru Avadhikkalathu (1999)
 Janani (1999)
 Saree (1999)
 Mazha (2000)
 Oru Cheru Punchiri (2000)
 Sayahnam (2000)
 Jeevan Masai (2001)
 Meghamalhar (2002)
 Mitr, My Friend (2002)
 Sthithi (2002)
 Dance like a Man (2003)
 In Othello (2003)
 Margam (2003)
 Ee Snehatheerathu (2004)
 Nerkku Nere (2004)
 Daivanamathil (2005)
 Kamli (2006)
 Chaurahen (2007)
 Kaiyoppu (2007)
 Bioscope (2008)
 Vilapangalkkappuram (2009)
 Patham Nilayile Theevandi (2009)
 Punyam Aham (2010)
 The Desire (2010)
 Inganeyum Oral (2010)
 Karmayogi (2012)
 Munnariyippu (2014)
 Sometimes (2017)
 Carbon (2018)
 Savithri - Aanum Pennum (2021)

Awards

National Film Awards 
 Best Editing  Mitr, My Friend (2002)
 Best Non-Feature Film Editing  Unni (2003)

Kerala State Film Awards 
 Best Editor  Daya (1998)
 Best Editor  Sayahnam (2000)
 Best Editor  Bioscope (2008)

References

External links 

"Have concerns on many issues as I step down: Bina Paul" (video) Manorama Online, October 16, 2014

Living people
Malayalam film editors
Film and Television Institute of India alumni
Best Editor National Film Award winners
Delhi University alumni
Kerala State Film Award winners
Women artists from Delhi
Film editors from Kerala
Women artists from Kerala
Artists from Thiruvananthapuram
Indian women filmmakers
20th-century Indian women artists
21st-century Indian women artists
Indian women film editors
Indian documentary film editors
Indian women documentary filmmakers
1961 births